Albert Evald Segerström (14 May 1902 – 13 March 1985) was a Swedish race walker. He placed 11th in the 50 km event at the 1936 Summer Olympics and sixth at the 1938 European Championships.

References

1902 births
1985 deaths
Athletes (track and field) at the 1936 Summer Olympics
Olympic athletes of Sweden
Swedish male racewalkers
Sportspeople from Norrköping